is a former Japanese long-distance runner, best known from winning the gold medal in the marathon at the 1991 World Championships in Athletics in Tokyo. The favourite to win the race, Olympic champion Gelindo Bordin, only finished eighth. The marathon was run under extremely adverse conditions of heat and humidity, which are reflected in the slow winning time of 2:14:57h. Taniguchi is the only male Japanese runner ever to have won a gold medal at World Championships.

Taniguchi also won the Beppu-Ōita Marathon in 1985 and the London Marathon in 1987.

Achievements
All results regarding marathon, unless stated otherwise

External links

1960 births
Living people
Japanese male long-distance runners
Japanese male marathon runners
Athletes (track and field) at the 1992 Summer Olympics
Athletes (track and field) at the 1996 Summer Olympics
Olympic athletes of Japan
Nippon Sport Science University alumni
London Marathon male winners
World Athletics Championships medalists
Asian Games medalists in athletics (track and field)
Athletes (track and field) at the 1986 Asian Games
Asian Games silver medalists for Japan
Medalists at the 1986 Asian Games
World Athletics Championships winners